Cuori nella tormenta (Hearts in the storm) is a 1984 Italian romantic comedy film. It marked the directorial debut of Enrico Oldoini.

Plot 
Walter is a non-commissioned officer of the Navy, while Raf is a ship's cook; they become great friends but unfortunately they fall in love, without knowing it, with the same girl, Sonia, who clearly prefers the most brilliant Walter. The girl does not have the courage to reveal it to Raf, who believes instead that she loves him to death.

Cast 

Carlo Verdone as Walter Migliorini 
Lello Arena as Raffaele aka "Raf"
Marina Suma as Sonia 
Rossana Di Lorenzo as Walter's Mother

See also  
 List of Italian films of 1984

References

External links

1984 films
Italian romantic comedy films
1984 romantic comedy films
Films directed by Enrico Oldoini
Films scored by Manuel De Sica
Films scored by Fiorenzo Carpi
1980s Italian-language films
1980s Italian films